A statue of Christopher Columbus was installed in Denver, Colorado, United States. It was the work of noted Denver-based artist William F. Joseph, dedicated in 1972.  Joseph's statue was later vandalized and torn down by protestors in June 2020.

See also

 List of monuments and memorials to Christopher Columbus

References

Monuments and memorials in Colorado
Outdoor sculptures in Denver
Monuments and memorials removed during the George Floyd protests
Sculptures of men in Colorado
Statues in Colorado
Denver
Vandalized works of art in Colorado
Statues removed in 2020